This is a list of former municipalities of Norway, i.e. municipalities that no longer exist.

When the local council system was introduced in Norway in 1837-38, the country had 392 municipalities. In 1958 the number had grown to a total of 744 rural municipalities, 64 city municipalities as well as a small number of small seaports with ladested status. A committee led by Nikolai Schei, formed in 1946 to examine the situation, proposed hundreds of mergers to reduce the number of municipalities and improve the quality of local administration. Most of the mergers were carried out, albeit to significant popular protest.

As of January 2006 there are 431 municipalities in Norway, and there are plans for further mergers and political pressure to do so. In 2002 Erna Solberg, Minister of Local Government and Regional Development at the time, expressed a wish to reduce the current tally with 100. The Ministry spent approximately 140 million NOK on a project to elucidate the possibilities in this field, and referendums were held in several municipalities in conjunction with the municipal elections of 2003. A small number of municipalities agreed to the plan; for instance the municipality of Frei merged with Kristiansund on January 1, 2008. Others rejected the possibility following the referendums, such as Hobøl and Spydeberg or Hol and Ål. The project was abandoned by Solberg's successor Åslaug Haga in early 2006.  In 2016 and 2017, when Erna Solberg was the Prime Minister of Norway, she and her government pushed for further municipal consolidations that mostly took place in 2020, reducing the number of municipalities to 356.

Some municipalities ceased to exist only for a limited amount of time, such as Flakstad and Hole (which were former municipalities between 1964 and 1976). In cases like these, the mergers of municipalities were reversed and the former municipalities once again became self-governing. On the other hand, a small number of newly created municipalities were abolished in the same way, for instance Tolga-Os, which came into being as a result of a 1966 merger which was reversed in 1976.

List by county (pre-2020 division)

Akershus
<onlyinclude>

Aust-Agder

Buskerud

Finnmark

Hedmark

Hordaland

Møre og Romsdal

Nordland

Oppland

Rogaland

Sogn og Fjordane

Telemark

Troms

Trøndelag

Vest-Agder

Vestfold

Østfold

References

Notes

Norway, former
 
Municipalities, former
Municipalities, former
Municipalities, former